The 2020 Abu Dhabi Grand Prix (officially known as the Formula 1 Etihad Airways Abu Dhabi Grand Prix 2020) was a Formula One motor race held on 13 December 2020 at the Yas Marina Circuit in Abu Dhabi, United Arab Emirates. The race was the seventeenth and final race of the 2020 Formula One World Championship. Red Bull driver Max Verstappen won the race and led every lap from pole position, followed by Mercedes drivers Valtteri Bottas and Lewis Hamilton who completed the podium. Red Bull Racing got their first victory at Yas Marina in seven years. McLaren secured third place in the Constructors' Championship which saw them score their highest finish in the Constructors' Championship since 2012. This also meant that for the first time since 2015, a team other than Mercedes, Ferrari and Red Bull finished in the top three in the Constructors' Championship.

Background

Impact of the COVID-19 pandemic 

The opening rounds of the  championship were heavily affected by the COVID-19 pandemic. Several Grands Prix were cancelled or postponed after the aborted opening round in Australia, prompting the FIA to draft a new calendar. The Bahrain Grand Prix was moved to the Abu Dhabi Grand Prix's original date, delaying the race by two weeks. Due to a surge of COVID-19 cases in the country, organisers announced that the Grand Prix would take place behind closed doors.

Entrants

The drivers and teams were the same as the pre-season entry list with the only exception being Romain Grosjean, who was replaced by Pietro Fittipaldi at the Sakhir Grand Prix. Mick Schumacher drove for Haas in the first practice session, in place of Kevin Magnussen, while Robert Kubica drove for Alfa Romeo Racing, in place of Antonio Giovinazzi. Robert Shwartzman, who competed in Formula 2, was also due to appear in the first practice session, driving for Haas. However, he did not appear on the entry list. Lewis Hamilton was confirmed as an entrant shortly before the race, having tested negative for the coronavirus, which had caused him to miss the previous round in Sakhir, where Williams driver George Russell took his place.

The race also marked the 100th Grand Prix start for Haas and the 400th for Renault.

Tyres 

Sole tyre supplier Pirelli provided the C3, C4 and C5 tyre compounds (the softest selection available) for use in dry conditions. Pirelli tested the 2021 tyre compounds during the second practice session.

Penalties 
Charles Leclerc incurred a three-place grid penalty for the race after causing a collision with Sergio Pérez at the Sakhir Grand Prix. Pérez and Kevin Magnussen were required to start from the back of the grid for exceeding their quotas of power unit elements.

Practice 
The first practice session ended with Max Verstappen fastest ahead of Valtteri Bottas and Esteban Ocon. The second practice session was red-flagged for 10 minutes after Kimi Räikkönen's Alfa Romeo Racing C39 caught fire, and ended with Valtteri Bottas fastest ahead of Lewis Hamilton and Max Verstappen. Verstappen set the fastest time in the third free practice session, followed by his teammate Alexander Albon and Renault driver Daniel Ricciardo.

Qualifying 
Max Verstappen of Red Bull got pole position for the first time since the 2019 Brazilian Grand Prix and the third of his career overall. This was the only pole position of the season achieved by a car not powered by a Mercedes engine and the first time since 2013 that Mercedes have not taken pole at the Yas Marina Circuit. Valtteri Bottas and Lewis Hamilton qualified 2nd and 3rd for Mercedes with Lando Norris of McLaren in 4th, Alexander Albon in the other Red Bull 5th and Carlos Sainz Jr. 6th. Sebastian Vettel started his last race for Ferrari from 13th place. George Russell qualified 18th fastest on his return to Williams ahead of Pietro Fittipaldi of Haas and teammate Nicholas Latifi.

Qualifying classification 

 Notes
  – Charles Leclerc received a three-place grid penalty for causing a collision at the Sakhir Grand Prix.
  – Sergio Pérez and Kevin Magnussen were required to start from the back of the grid for exceeding their quotas of power unit elements.

Race

Race summary
Verstappen led every lap of the race from pole. Bottas and Hamilton completed the podium with the top 3 remaining in grid order. Albon managed to overtake Lando Norris for 4th place. Norris finished fifth ahead of his teammate Sainz in 6th, with McLaren finishing third in the Constructors' Championship, helped by the fact that Racing Point's Sergio Pérez retired with a technical problem on lap 9. Renault driver Ricciardo, who achieved the fastest lap, was next in 7th with Gasly in 8th. Ocon passed Stroll for 9th on the final lap. Kimi Räikkönen's Alfa Romeo was the lead Ferrari-powered car, finishing 12th ahead of the Ferraris of Charles Leclerc and Sebastian Vettel. Pietro Fittipaldi was the last of all the finishers in 19th place, two laps down of race winner Verstappen.

Post-race
The Race reported that Hamilton was criticised after the race for saying that he was not feeling "100%" since he had COVID-19, although he felt grateful to be alive. Verstappen was pleased with victory but did not necessarily think the team would be title challengers in 2021. George Russell said he found readapting to the Williams for this event much tougher than adapting to the Mercedes for the Sakhir Grand Prix.

Race classification 

 Notes
  – Includes one point for fastest lap.

Final Championship standings

Drivers' Championship standings

Constructors' Championship standings

 Note: Only the top five positions are included for both sets of standings.
 Bold text indicates the 2020 World Champions.

Notes

References

External links 

Abu Dhabi Grand Prix
Abu Dhabi Grand Prix
Abu Dhabi Grand Prix
Abu Dhabi Grand Prix
Abu Dhabi Grand Prix, 2020